Rangle River is a 1936 Australian Western film directed by Clarence G. Badger based on a story by Zane Grey.

Synopsis
Marion Hastings returns to her father Dan's cattle property in western Queensland after being away in Europe for fifteen years. She is treated with hostility by her father's foreman, Dick Drake, and her father's neighbour, Don Lawton.

The river on the Hastings' property keeps drying up. An English house guest, Reggie Mannister discovers that the river is being dammed by Donald Lawton. Marion goes to investigate as Lawton dynamites his dam. Marion is trapped in the flood. Drake comes her to aid, rescues Marion from drowning and helps defeat Lawton in a whip duel.

Dick and Marion are reunited and walk off into the sunset, with Marion holding the whip, literally.

Cast
Victor Jory as Dick Drake
Margaret Dare as Marion Hastings
Robert Coote as Reggie Mannister
Cecil Perry as Donald Lawton
George Bryant as Dan Hastings
Leo Cracknell as Barbwire
Georgie Stirling as Minna
Rita Pauncefort as Aunt Abbie
Stewart McColl as Black

Production
The movie was partly financed by a Hollywood studio, Columbia, and used an imported American star, director and principal technicians. It was made by National Studios, who owned Pagewood Film Studios and had links with National Productions, the company that made The Flying Doctor (1936).
 
The original story was written by popular writer Zane Grey while at Bermagui during his 1935 fishing tour of Australia, a period which also produced the film White Death (1936). The script was adapted by Charles and Elsa Chauvel. It features a number of stock characters from Australian films and theatre of the time, such as the "squatter's daughter" and the "English new chum".
 
The role of Marion Hastings was originally offered to Nancy O'Neil, an Australian actor living in England. The director, Clarence G. Badger was imported from Hollywood, as was star Victor Jory. The female lead was finally given to a Sydney girl, Peggy Barnes, who changed her name to Margaret Dare. She was signed to a three-year contract with National Studios but asked to be released from it.
 
Although there was some suggestion the film would be made in Queensland it was eventually shot on location near Gloucester and in the Burragorang Valley.
 
While in Australia, Jory's activities were widely reported. He attended social functions, appeared on radio and went shooting in the Northern Territory. His wife, actress Jean Inness, appeared under her own name in a performance of The Royal Family of Broadway at the Theatre Royal in October 1936. Jory was fined for speeding while driving in Sydney.

Reception
Andrew Pike and Ross Cooper report that after an opening at Sydney's Plaza Theatre in December 1936, the film enjoyed a successful run in Australia. The critic from The Sydney Morning Herald described it as "the best film that has been produced in Australia so far".

Overseas Release
The film was released in the UK after some cuts were made by the censor to the whip fighting scene and was issued in the US under the title Men with Whips by the J.H. Hoffberg Company Inc.

Proposed Sequel
National Studios were keen to produce a sequel. A shooting script was written, Clarence Badger agreed to return and by December 1936 an agreement had almost been formed with Columbia Pictures. Then the government announced that the New South Wales Film Quota Act would be not be enforced and Columbia withdrew. Said Frederick Davies of National Studios:
We would go on and produce the picture ourselves, if we could. But, to be quite frank our company cannot obtain enough money from the investors. From the moment when The Burgomeister was rejected by the advisory board, with the consequence that it had to be shelved at a total loss, the public shied away from the business side of Australian motion pictures.
 
Robert Coote went to Hollywood after filming and enjoyed a long career there. In January 1937 Margaret Dare left for Los Angeles but she made no further films
 
Clarence Badger settled in Australia but only made one more feature, That Certain Something (1941).

References

External links
Rangle River in the Internet Movie Database
Rangle River at Australian Screen Online
Rangle River at Oz Movies
Deborah Tudor, "Cultural Intersections in Early Australian Sound Films: Rangle River (1936)" Democratic Communique, 19 Spring 2004

1936 films
Films based on works by Zane Grey
Australian Western (genre) films
Columbia Pictures films
1936 Western (genre) films
Australian black-and-white films
1930s English-language films